The Manchester Central by-election was a by-election for the House of Commons constituency of Manchester Central held on Thursday 15 November 2012.

Lucy Powell of the Labour Party won with 69% of the vote (it has historically been a safe Labour seat), with the Liberal Democrats and the Conservatives losing significant numbers of votes compared with the 2010 general election (with the Conservatives losing their deposit). In terms of loss of share of the vote it was the Lib Dems' worst result in a parliamentary by-election since the Second World War. There was an unusually low turnout of just 18.2%, the lowest in a Parliamentary by-election since the War.

The by-election was held on the same day as the Cardiff South and Penarth and Corby by-elections, and the first ever Police and Crime Commissioner elections.

Background
On 14 February 2012, the incumbent Member of Parliament for Manchester Central, Tony Lloyd, announced his intention to resign to seek the Labour Party nomination for the inaugural Police and Crime Commissioner elections for the Greater Manchester Police area which was also held on 15 November 2012. The England and Wales Police and Crime Commissioner elections were on the same day. On 17 March 2012, Lloyd was selected by Labour unopposed. On 22 October 2012, Tony Lloyd was appointed Steward and Bailiff of the Manor of Northstead, a device with which resignations from the House of Commons is administered. Lloyd successfully won the PCC election. PCC election candidates did not have to resign their seats in Parliament upon becoming a nominee. However, in the event of their victory in the election they would have been obliged to do so. Knowing that his likelihood of victory in a traditionally pro-Labour region was high, Lloyd chose to resign early in order for the Westminster by-election to be able to be held at the same time as the PCC election rather than forcing voters to go to the polls again a few weeks later. The decision to resign upon nomination rather than victory was similarly made by Alun Michael, who had been nominated as a PCC candidate for the South Wales Police area and resulted in the 2012 Cardiff South and Penarth by-election being held on the same day.

All registered Parliamentary electors of the Manchester Central constituency (i.e. British, Irish and Commonwealth citizens living in the UK and British citizens living overseas) who were aged 18 or over on 15 November 2012 were entitled to vote in the by-election. The deadline for voters to register to vote in the by-election was midnight on Wednesday 31 October 2012. However, those who qualified as an anonymous elector had until midnight on Thursday 8 November 2012 to register to vote.

Candidates
Nominations closed and 12 candidates were confirmed on 31 October.

On 28 March 2012, Labour confirmed a shortlist of eight candidates. Lucy Powell, Chief of Staff, to party leader Ed Miliband was selected on 16 April. The satirical magazine, Private Eye, reported on Powell's selection noting that "the previous favourite to succeed Lloyd had been Mohammed Afzal Khan, the first ever Asian lord mayor of Manchester, with a good deal of popular local backing and a city councillor since 2000. But nothing could be left to chance and Khan was mysteriously dropped from the Labour party's candidate shortlist - in order to gift the seat to Powell." Powell was also nominated by the Co-operative Party.

The Liberal Democrats chose the former City Councillor Marc Ramsbottom on 18 June 2012, declaring the by-election "a two horse race".

On 17 October 2012, the Conservative Party chose Matthew Sephton, Chairman of LGBTory and Deputy Chairman of the party in Altrincham and Sale West, as their candidate. Sephton had previously stood as the Conservative candidate in Salford and Eccles during the 2010 general election.

Following a membership meeting the British National Party chose Eddy O'Sullivan as its candidate.

The former Lord Mayor of Norwich Tom Dylan was the Green Party candidate.

Respect initially chose Kate Hudson as its candidate, but she stood down because of George Galloway's comments about rape. On 30 October 2012, local "community advocate" Catherine Higgins was selected as the Respect candidate.

The Trade Unionist and Socialist Coalition announced its intention to contest this by-election (and a council by-election in Liverpool and the election for Mayor of Bristol on the same day) with the PCS Union's North-West vice-chair Alex Davidson chosen on 10 October.

Pirate Party UK chose their Leader, Loz Kaye.

Howling Laud Hope, party leader, stood for the Official Monster Raving Loony Party under the description Monster Raving Loony William Hill Party.

Local factory worker Peter Clifford announced on 21 July that he intended to stand as the Communist League candidate. Clifford told The Guardian newspaper on 8 August that "the power of working people... counts more than an election result."

On 29 August 2012, the newly formed People's Democratic Party announced that its candidate would be the party leader and former Conservative and anti-Iraq War activist, Lee Holmes. Holmes told Mancunian Matters that Manchester politics "represented all that was wrong with British democracy". He admitted to The Guardian that he had never lived in Manchester.

By-election result

See also
List of United Kingdom by-elections
Opinion polling for the 2015 United Kingdom general election

References

Manchester Central by-election
Manchester Central by-election
Manchester Central by-election
Central
2010s in Manchester